The National Arts Centre (NAC) is a Canadian centre for the performing arts located in Ottawa, Ontario, along the Rideau Canal. It is operated by the eponymous performing arts organisation National Arts Centre. The National Arts Centre was designated a National Historic Site of Canada in 2006.

History
In 1928, the National Capital Commission expropriated and demolished the Russell Theatre to make way for Confederation Square, leaving Ottawa without a major performing arts venue. Performers and orchestras visiting the capital were required to use the stage of the Capitol Cinema, which had been designed for vaudeville and films. In 1963, G. Hamilton Southam and Levi Pettler founded the National Capital Arts Alliance with the goal of creating a suitable venue. They successfully convinced the city and government to build the new centre downtown on Elgin Street and the Rideau Canal.

The NAC was one of a number of projects launched by the government of Lester B. Pearson to commemorate Canada's 1967 centenary. It opened its doors to the public for the first time on 31 May 1969, at a cost of C$46 million. The site at one time was home to Ottawa City Hall, and the city donated the land to the federal government. In June 2010,  Queen Elizabeth II unveiled a life-size bronze statue of the Canadian jazz pianist Oscar Peterson outside the NAC during her royal tour of Canada.

Architecture

The building, designed by Fred Lebensold, is in the Brutalist style and is based on the shape of a triangle and hexagon. The building is constructed of reinforced concrete. The exterior and many interior walls are faced with precast concrete panels containing exposed aggregate of crushed brown Laurentian granite. The centre rises from a base that sits on a 950-space underground parking garage. The base houses offices, lobbies, dressing rooms, workshops and a restaurant. The site slopes from Elgin Street to the Rideau Canal allowing for a second underground level overlooking the canal. The roof of the base forms a multi-level terrace containing gardens that are open to the public and connects to the Mackenzie King Bridge. The three main performance spaces rise from the base as a series of hexagonal structures also faced with brown precast panels in a variety of textures. Windows are tall, narrow slits framed by vertical ribs. The hexagonal theme flows through the interior and appears in ceilings, light fixtures and flooring. Lobbies and stairwells house several major pieces of visual art.

Plans for the centre included an organ in Southam Hall; however, funding did not permit this. On 17 March 1970, the 25th anniversary of the liberation of the Netherlands, a Dutch-Canadian Committee presented two organs purchased as the result of its Operation Thankyou Canada. The 21-stop concert organ and positiv organ were both constructed by the Flentrop Orgelbouw of Zaandam and given in gratitude for the role played by Canadian troops in the liberation of the Netherlands. The concert organ premiered in a recital 7 October 1973 by Albert de Klerk.

In 2000, the NAC was named by the Royal Architectural Institute of Canada as one of the top 500 buildings produced in Canada during the last millennium.

In 2014, Heritage Minister Shelly Glover and Foreign Affairs Minister John Baird announced a $110 million facelift of the NAC. At construction, the centre was oriented toward a planned lagoon on the east, which was never constructed. The work would expand meeting and event facilities, install entrances and windows to reorient the focus toward Parliament Hill, and upgrade washroom facilities. The renovated centre opened 1 July 2017 for Canada's 150th Anniversary.

Performance facilities 
The NAC has four stages:
 Southam Hall, with 2,065 seats, is the largest stage and is home to the National Arts Centre Orchestra and the Ottawa Symphony Orchestra as well as ballet and other major visiting shows and productions.
Babs Asper Theatre, with 897 seats, is mostly used for theatre and dance events, plus some concerts. It is home to the English-language and French-language theatre companies.
Azrieli Studio, with 307 seats, is a theatre venue and musical concert space suited for performances requiring a more intimate space.
Fourth Stage, with 146 chairs, opened in 2001 and was completely rebuilt in 2016-17, reopening in October, 2017. It is home to most NAC Presents concerts and a wide variety of community programming.

See also 
List of concert halls

References

Further reading

External links

Ottawa Chamber Music Society
Construction of the NAC (YouTube)
National Arts Centre Corporation fonds (R854) at Library and Archives Canada
Sarah Jennings fonds (R14484) at Library and Archives Canada. The fonds documents essentially the history of the National Arts Centre. Records are the primary sources for Jennings's book Art and Politics: The History of the National Arts Centre.

Performing arts centres in Canada
Concert halls in Canada
Music venues in Ottawa
Federal departments and agencies of Canada
Department of Canadian Heritage
Theatres in Ottawa
Modernist architecture in Canada
Brutalist architecture in Canada
Event venues established in 1969
Arcop buildings
Theatres on the National Historic Sites of Canada register
Canadian Centennial
National Historic Sites in Ontario
1969 establishments in Ontario
Festival venues in Canada